is a Japanese speed skater. She competed in four events at the 1964 Winter Olympics.

References

1943 births
Living people
Japanese female speed skaters
Olympic speed skaters of Japan
Speed skaters at the 1964 Winter Olympics
Sportspeople from Nagano Prefecture